Roberto "Robertão" José Corrêa (born 3 January 1951), also commonly known as Roberto Corrêa, or simply as, "Robertão", is a Brazilian former professional basketball player.

Professional playing career
During his pro club career, Robertão won 5 Brazilian Championships, in the seasons 1971, 1974, 1975, 1980, and 1981 (II), while a member of Franca. He also played with the Brazilian clubs Flamengo, Araçatuba, COC/Ribeirão Preto, and Yara Clube.

National team playing career
With the senior Brazilian national basketball team, Robertão competed the 1974 FIBA World Cup and the 1978 FIBA World Cup.

He won a gold medal at the 1971 Pan American Games, and a bronze medal at the 1975 Pan American Games. He also won gold medals at the 1971 FIBA South American Championship, and the 1973 FIBA South American Championship.

References

External links
FIBA Profile 1
FIBA Profile 2
Brazilian Basketball Federation Profile 

1949 births
Living people
Brazilian men's basketball players
1974 FIBA World Championship players
1978 FIBA World Championship players
Flamengo basketball players
Franca Basquetebol Clube players
Small forwards
Pan American Games medalists in basketball
Pan American Games gold medalists for Brazil
Pan American Games bronze medalists for Brazil
Basketball players at the 1971 Pan American Games
Basketball players at the 1975 Pan American Games
Medalists at the 1971 Pan American Games
Basketball players from Rio de Janeiro (city)